Ugong Pasig National High School (abbreviated as UPNHS) is a national high school in Ugong, Pasig. It was established through the enactment Republic Act No. 10464 on April 16, 2013.

References

Schools in Pasig
High schools in Metro Manila